Sīmǎ Yán (司馬炎) is the personal name of Emperor Wu of Jin, the founding monarch of Jin dynasty (266–420).

Sima Yan also refers to:

Sīmǎ Yǎn (司馬演), eleventh son of Emperor Wu of Jin;
Sīmǎ Yàn (司馬晏), another son of Emperor Wu of Jin and father of Emperor Min of Jin;
Sīmǎ Yǎn (司馬衍), personal name of Emperor Cheng of Jin.